Lawful Larceny is a lost 1923 American silent drama film directed by Allan Dwan and written by John Lynch and Samuel Shipman. The film stars Hope Hampton, Conrad Nagel, Nita Naldi, Lew Cody, Russell Griffin, and Yvonne Hughes. The film was released on July 22, 1923, by  Paramount Pictures.

The film was remade at RKO Pictures in 1930 as a sound film of the same title with Bebe Daniels in the lead role.

Plot
As described in a film magazine review, Vivian Hepburn, a modern vampire, runs a gambling house with Guy Tarlow, a male partner who directs the victims to the house. She financially ruins Andrew Dorsey while his young wife Marion is in Europe. When she returns she hears all about the woman and is determined to obtain revenge. She goes to the gambling house and succeeds in ensnaring the vampire's partner, and by this means she is able to win back her husband's fortune and regain her own happiness.

Cast
Hope Hampton as Marion Dorsey
Conrad Nagel as Andrew Dorsey
Nita Naldi as Vivian Hepburn
Lew Cody as Guy Tarlow
Russell Griffin as Sonny Dorsey
Yvonne Hughes as Billy Van de Vere
Dolores Costello as Nora the maid
Gilda Gray as Dancer
Florence O'Denishawn as Dancer
Alice Maison as Dancer

References

External links 

 
 Film still at listal.com
 Advertisement at www.silentfilmstillarchive.com.

1923 films
1920s English-language films
Silent American drama films
1923 drama films
Paramount Pictures films
Films directed by Allan Dwan
American black-and-white films
Lost American films
American silent feature films
1923 lost films
Lost drama films
1920s American films